The 2003–04 season was Swindon Town's fourth season in the Division Two since their relegation from the second tier of English football in 2000. Alongside the league campaign, Swindon Town also competed in the FA Cup, League Cup and the Football League Trophy.

Nationwide League Division Two

Second Division play-offs

Results and matchday squads

Division Two line-ups 

1 1st Substitution, 2 2nd Substitution, 3 3rd Substitution.

Division Two Play-Offs line-ups 

1 1st Substitution, 2 2nd Substitution, 3 3rd Substitution.

FA Cup line-ups 

1 1st Substitution, 2 2nd Substitution, 3 3rd Substitution.

League Cup line-ups 

1 1st Substitution, 2 2nd Substitution, 3 3rd Substitution.

Football League Trophy line-ups 

1 1st Substitution, 2 2nd Substitution, 3 3rd Substitution.

References 

Swindon Town F.C. seasons
Swindon Town